Sar Avar (also Romanized as Sar Āvar and Sarāwar) is a village in Jolgeh Rural District, in the Central District of Golpayegan County, Isfahan Province, Iran. At the 2006 census, its population was 539, in 172 families.

References 

Populated places in Golpayegan County